Acrolophus superstes is a moth of the family Acrolophidae. It is found in Guatemala.

References

Moths described in 1914
superstes